The 2004–05 PBA season was the 30th season of the Philippine Basketball Association. Instead of the usual calendar year of February–December, the league changed its schedule to the current October–July format, while limiting the number of conferences from three to two. As part of the new league format, the season was preceded with a transition conference known as the 2004 PBA Fiesta Conference.

Opening ceremonies
The muses for the participating teams are as follows:

2004-05 Philippine Cup

Barangay Ginebra won its first back-to-back titles and sixth overall crown with a 4-2 conquest over Talk 'N Text Phone Pals. The series was marred by a controversial reversal of the Phone Pals' Game 1 victory after fielding in an ineligible Taulava in the said game. Taulava was serving an indefinite suspension after being cited as one of six Filipino-American players with questionable citizenship papers.

The San Miguel Beermen won third place after beating the Shell Turbo Chargers in a one-game match.

Eric Menk won another Best Player of the Conference Award, his third in his PBA career.

Chot Reyes left his post as the Coca Cola Tigers head coach to become the new coach of the Philippine national basketball team.

Classification round

Playoffs

Finals

|}
 Finals MVP: Eric Menk (Brgy. Ginebra)
 Best Player of the Conference: Eric Menk (Brgy. Ginebra)

2005 Fiesta Conference

San Miguel won its 17th PBA title with a 4-1 series victory over Talk N' Text. The league finally allowed Asi Taulava to play in the finals series. 

Shell won third place over Red Bull in a one-game playoff, which turn out to be the last appearance of the Turbo Chargers in the league as it filed a leave of absence in August 2005.  Shell eventually sell their rights to Welcoat.

Talk N' Text's Willie Miller was named the Best Player of the Conference while teammate Jerald Honeycutt won the Best Import plum.

Classification round

Playoffs

Finals

|}
 Finals MVP: Danny Ildefonso (San Miguel)
 Best Player of the Conference: Willie Miller (Talk 'N Text)
 Best Import Award: Jerald Honeycutt (Talk 'N Text)

Awards
 Most Valuable Player: Eric Menk (Brgy. Ginebra)
 Rookie of the Year: Rich Alvarez (Shell)
 Most Improved Player: Enrico Villanueva (Red Bull)
 Mythical First Team
 Eric Menk (Brgy. Ginebra)
 Jimmy Alapag (Talk N' Text)
 Willie Miller (Talk N' Text)
 Nic Belasco (San Miguel)
 Dorian Peña (San Miguel)
 Mythical Second Team
 Mark Caguioa (Brgy. Ginebra)
 Olsen Racela (San Miguel)
 Mark Telan (Talk N' Text)
 Tony dela Cruz (Shell)
 Rommel Adducul (Brgy. Ginebra)
 All-Defensive Team
 Enrico Villanueva (Red Bull)
 Rich Alvarez (Shell)
 Junthy Valenzuela (Red Bull)
 Johnny Abarrientos (Coca-Cola)
 Dennis Espino (Sta. Lucia)

Awards given by the PBA Press Corps
 Coach of the Year: Siot Tanquincen (Barangay Ginebra)
 Mr. Quality Minutes: Ronald Tubid (Shell)
 Comeback Player of the Year: Jayjay Helterbrand (Barangay Ginebra)
 Referee of the Year: Luisito Cruz
All-Rookie Team
Paul Artadi (Purefoods)
James Yap (Purefoods)
Rich Alvarez (Shell)
Ranidel de Ocampo (Air21)
Sonny Thoss (Alaska)

Cumulative standings

Elimination round

Playoffs

References

External links
 PBA.ph

 
PBA